The 'Stadtwerke Oberhausen AG' (STOAG) is the local transport organization for the city of Oberhausen, Germany.  It is a member of the regional transport organization Verkehrsverbund Rhein-Ruhr (VRR). The STOAG operates 6 express bus lines, as well as 10 citybus lines which are operated jointly with Urban-Reisen, and 6 Regional-lines which are partially operated by the STOAG.  The city also has 7 Regional-lines which aren't operated by STOAG.

The STOAG has more than 120 buses and 6 trams for the line 112 which drives out of the neighbour-town Mülheim to the Neumarkt in Sterkrade. Most buses drives each 20 or 30 minutes which is usual for the Ruhr-Area.

Since the year 2015 the STOAG has, as the first organization of the Ruhr Area, two electric buses for the lines 962 and 966.

The STOAG planned with the Vestische, the organization of the neighbour town, to change the line 979  also to the electric bus system during the year 2018.

Network 

The STOAG network has changed a lot in the last years. This is the present network, state 04.10.2015. Lines that lead through Oberhausen but are not maintained by the STOAG are included in  the table. 

The STOAG also operates a night network with the lines NE1 until NE7, NE10 until NE12 and NE21. 

All italic written stops are out of Oberhausen.

External links
Stadtwerke Oberhausen (STOAG)
Tram Travels: Stadtwerke Oberhausen (STOAG)

Oberhausen
Public services of Germany
Companies based in Oberhausen
Transport in Oberhausen